Mika Välilä (born February 28, 1970) is a retired Swedish-born Finnish professional ice hockey player.  Välilä was drafted by the Pittsburgh Penguins of the National Hockey League, selected 130th overall in the 1990 NHL Entry Draft.

Välilä also holds the distinction of scoring the overtime winner in the longest game in Swedish hockey history, scoring in the fifth overtime vs Bofors IK on March 20, 2002.

Career statistics

Awards and accomplishments
1987-1988, U18 EJC Silver Medal
1989-1990, SM-liiga All-Rookie Team
1990, World Junior Championship, Best Player of Team Finland
1991-1992, SM-liiga Champion
1993-1994, SM-liiga Bronze Medal

External links
 

1970 births
Jokerit players
Kiekko-Vantaa players
Living people
People from Södertälje
Pittsburgh Penguins draft picks
Finnish ice hockey centres
Tappara players